Cessy is a commune in the Ain department in eastern France. The area was first inhabited by two farming families in the eleventh century, and as the town has grown its agricultural heritage has remained a significant feature, with the populated area surrounded by a vast expanse of fields and an annual agricultural festival.

Geography

Climate

Cessy has a oceanic climate (Köppen climate classification Cfb).

Population

Compact Muon Solenoid

One of the primary points of interest in the quiet community of Cessy, France 
is the Compact Muon Solenoid (CMS) experiment, located 100 meters below ground 
at a site on the south-eastern edge of the village.  CMS is a high-energy particle physics experiment which observes the 
result of high energy proton-proton collisions of the CERN laboratory's Large 
Hadron Collider (LHC) particle accelerator.

Personalities
Tim Berners-Lee lived on Rue de la Mairie in Cessy when he, with Robert Cailliau, invented the World Wide Web.

See also
 Communes of the Ain department
 Compact Muon Solenoid

References

Communes of Ain
Ain communes articles needing translation from French Wikipedia